The 2019 IFF Women's World Floorball Championships was the 12th staging of the Women's World Floorball Championship, contested by the senior women's national teams of the members of the International Floorball Federation (IFF), the sport's global governing body. The final tournament took place in Neuchâtel, Switzerland from 7 to 15 December 2019. Switzerland played hosts for this event for the third time.

Sweden won the tournament defeating Switzerland, 3–2, in the final game.

Qualification

Venues

Draw
The draw took place on 14 February 2019 at Ittigen, Switzerland.

Preliminary round

Group A

Group B

Group C

Group D

Knockout stage

Bracket

Play-off round

Quarterfinals

Semifinals

Bronze-medal game

Final

Placement round

13th place Bracket

13–16th-place semifinals

15th-place game

13th-place game

9th place Bracket

9–12th-place semifinals

11th-place game

9th-place game

5th place Bracket

5–8th-place semifinals

7th-place game

5th-place game

Final ranking

References

External links
Official website

Floorball World Championships
2019 in floorball
International floorball competitions hosted by Switzerland
2019 in Swiss sport
Sport in Neuchâtel
Women's World Floorball Championships
2019 in Swiss women's sport